In the Name of Metal may refer to:

In the Name of Metal, a 1986 album by Executioner
In the Name of Metal, a 2012 album by Bloodbound